New Paris is a census-designated place (CDP) in Elkhart County, Indiana, United States. The population was 1,494 at the 2010 census.

History
New Paris was laid out in 1839 by settlers from Preble County, Ohio. It was likely named after New Paris, Ohio. By the 1890s, New Paris had become a shipping point at the junction of two railroads.

Geography
New Paris is located in Jackson Township (T35N R6E) at  (41.5037, -85.8295).

Demographics

As of the census of 2000, there were 1,006 people, 377 households, and 286 families residing in the CDP. The racial makeup of the CDP was 97.71% White, 0.10% Native American, 1.19% from other races, and 0.99% from two or more races. Hispanic or Latino of any race were 1.99% of the population.

There were 377 households, out of which 34.7% had children over the age of 18 living with them, 63.1% were married couples living together, 8.2% had a female householder with no husband present, and 23.9% were non-families. 20.7% of all households were made up of individuals, and 6.9% had someone living alone who was 65 years of age or older. The average household size was 2.67 and the average family size was 3.09.

In the CDP, the population was spread out, with 29.7% under the age of 18, 7.0% from 18 to 24, 28.4% from 25 to 44, 20.3% from 45 to 64, and 14.6% who were 65 years of age or older. The median age was 35 years. For every 100 females, there were 95.3 males. For every 100 females age 18 and over, there were 93.2 males.

The median income for a household in the CDP was $42,446, and the median income for a family was $47,917. Males had a median income of $36,250 versus $24,038 for females. The per capita income for the CDP was $17,270. About 4.3% of families and 5.0% of the population were below the poverty line, including 7.9% of those under age 18 and none of those age 65 or over.

Schools
New Paris Elementary School was built in 1920 and served originally as a K-12 school.  Fairfield Junior-Senior High School was created in 1968, and subsequently served as the secondary school fed by New Paris and Millersburg Elementary School.  In 1999, a new elementary school named Benton Elementary School opened to serve the rural areas of New Paris and Millersburg. The enrollment at New Paris Elementary dropped as a result of Benton, but over time enrollment returned to historic levels.  In 2004, construction began on a new elementary school that was in a more rural area of New Paris.

Sunnyside Park
The park is a lightly stocked fishing and recreational pond with a nearby park building and several veterans' memorials. There is also a playground and outdoor pavilion.

In 2007, the park building was renovated and the parking areas were paved.

References

Census-designated places in Elkhart County, Indiana
Census-designated places in Indiana